The Bulldog and Bird classes were double-framed inside cylinder 4-4-0 steam locomotives used for passenger services on the Great Western Railway. The Bird Class were a development of the Bulldogs with strengthened outside frames, of which a total of fifteen were built. A total of 121 Bulldogs were built new, with a further twenty rebuilt from Duke Class locomotives. Thirty Bulldogs were later rebuilt as Earl Class locomotives and renumbered 3265 (prototype conversion), 3200-3228.

History

No. 3312 Bulldog was built in October 1898, with curved outside frames, a domed parallel boiler with a raised Belpaire firebox and a wrapper-type smokebox. The boiler was a prototype for the parallel version of Churchward's Standard No. 2 boilers. Bulldog was originally classed as a variant of the Duke Class.

In October 1899 no. 3352 Camel appeared with the final form of the parallel No. 2 boiler, domeless, with a raised Belpaire firebox and a circular drumhead smokebox supported on a curved saddle. A further twenty locomotives, nos. 3332 to 3351, were built between November 1899 and March 1900. Between May and December 1900 a second batch of twenty Camels (as the class were initially known) were built with straight-topped outside frames. These were numbered 3353 to 3372. A third batch, 3413 to 3432 were built between December 1902 and May 1903; these were the last to be built with parallel boilers.

In September 1903 no. 3443 Birkenhead was built with a tapered Standard No. 2 boiler. The boiler was tapered only over the rear half of the barrel, and this type became known as the "half-cone"; a later version of the No. 2 boiler was tapered over three-quarters of the barrel. A further twenty-nine locomotives were built with the half-cone boiler between September 1903 and April 1904, bringing the class total to ninety-one.

Between April and September 1906 thirty locomotives were built with the three-quarter coned No. 2 boiler. In March 1906, Bulldog was rebuilt with the same type of boiler, and the class now became known as the Bulldog Class. From October 1906 to January 1909 eighteen of the Duke Class were converted to Bulldogs by the fitting of No. 2 boilers. A further member of the Duke Class, no. 3273 Armorel, had been fitted with a parallel domeless boiler in February 1902, thus becoming a Camel Class locomotive. It ran with tapered boilers of various types from April 1906.

The Bird Class were a development of the Bulldog Class with deeper outside frames and a new type of bogie. Previously all outside framed bogies on GWR locomotives had been of the Dean centreless type. Churchward adapted a French design of bogie, as used on the de Glehn Atlantics, to produce a bar-framed bogie for his standard locomotives. This inside-framed bogie design was adapted to produce an outside-framed replacement for the Dean bogie. The Birds were built in two batches; nos. 3731 to 3735 in May 1909 and nos. 3736 to 3745 from November 1909 to January 1910.

This class were subject to the 1912 renumbering of GWR 4-4-0 locomotives, which saw the Bulldog Class gathered together in the series 3300-3455, and other types renumbered out of that series. The 3300-3455 series had previously contained locomotives of Duke, Badminton, Atbara, City and a number of Bulldog class locomotives.

No. 3320 Avalon was the first of the Bulldog Class to be withdrawn, in August 1929, followed by no. 3365 Charles Grey Mott, withdrawn in January 1930. The frames of 3365 were used to construct the first of the Earl Class, no. 3265 Tre Pol and Pen. The last to be withdrawn was no. 3377 Penzance in January 1951.

All of the Bird Class survived into British Railways ownership, being withdrawn between April 1948 and November 1951, the last two being no. 3453 Seagull and no. 3454 Skylark.

No Bulldogs were preserved; however the frames of no. 3425 survive under Earl no. 9017 'Earl of Berkeley' at the Bluebell Railway.

Accidents and incidents
In 1904, locomotive No. 3460 Montreal was one of two locomotives hauling a passenger train that was  derailed at Loughor, Glamorgan due to excessive speed. Five people were killed and eighteen were injured.

Bulldog Class

Bird Class

References

Bibliography

External links 
 3300 'Bulldog' class introduction The Great Western Archive

3300
4-4-0 locomotives
Standard gauge steam locomotives of Great Britain
Railway locomotives introduced in 1899
Passenger locomotives